Alf Gunnar Hambe (24 January 1931 – 6 May 2022) was a Swedish author, composer, and singer-songwriter, who was influential in the genre of Swedish ballads (visor).

Hambe was born in Rävinge near Halmstad in Halland, on the west coast of Sweden. His father, Johan Hambe, was a teacher and headmaster at the local school, and he also played the violin and wrote poetry. Alf Hambe went to school in Halmstad. After his graduation (studentexamen) in 1951, he studied in Helsingborg to become a primary school teacher.

He moved to Gothenburg in 1954, and had several temporary teaching jobs until the early 1960s, when he became a full-time author, composer and singer.

Hambe wrote more than 500 songs and poems, and released more than 30 records. He received several prizes and stipends during his lifetime, including the Fred Åkerström grant in 2007, and the royal medal Litteris et Artibus in 2008.

References

1931 births
2022 deaths
Litteris et Artibus recipients
Swedish-language writers
20th-century Swedish writers
21st-century Swedish writers
People from Halland